The Lion Woman is a 2016 Norwegian drama film directed by Vibeke Idsøe. The film is an international coproduction and had a budget of approximately NOK 52 million. Parts of the film were shot in Lillehammer, and the rest was recorded at various locations. The film had its world premiere on August 26, 2016.

Plot 
In 1912, a Norwegian woman dies in childbirth, leaving behind a daughter born with hypertrichosis, or excessive hair growth, and a grieving husband who hides the girl from gawkers.

Cast 
 Ida Ursin-Holm - Eva (23)
 Mathilde Thomine Storm - Eva (14)
 Aurora Lindseth-Løkka - Eva (7)
 Rolf Lassgård - Gustav
 Rolf Kristian Larsen - Sparky
 Kjersti Tveterås - Hannah
 Lars Knutzon - Professor Stroem
 Kåre Conradi - Jahnn
 Lisa Loven Kongsli - Ruth
 Connie Nielsen - Mrs. Grjothornet
 Henrik Mestad - Swammerdamm
 Ken Duken - Andrej

References

External links 

2016 drama films
Norwegian drama films
Films based on Norwegian novels
2010s Norwegian-language films